Woodland-Olney School is a historic school building located at Woodland, Northampton County, North Carolina.  It was built in 1928–1929, and is a two-story, 11 bay, "U"-shaped, Classical Revival style brick building.  It has a one-story auditorium, flat roof, and two-story three bay portico, pilasters, and decorative yellow brick horizontal bands. It operated as a public school until 1992.

It was listed on the National Register of Historic Places in 1997.

References

School buildings on the National Register of Historic Places in North Carolina
Neoclassical architecture in North Carolina
School buildings completed in 1929
Schools in Northampton County, North Carolina
National Register of Historic Places in Northampton County, North Carolina
1929 establishments in North Carolina